Busisiwe Tshwete (born 7 May 1981) is a South African politician and a Member of the National Assembly of South Africa for the African National Congress (ANC).

Tshwete was elected to the National Assembly in the 2019 South African general election.

She is currently a member of the National Assembly's  Portfolio Committee on Agriculture, Land Reform and Rural Development.

References

External links

Ms Busisiwe Tshwete at Parliament of South Africa

Living people
1981 births
21st-century South African politicians
African National Congress politicians
Members of the National Assembly of South Africa
Women members of the National Assembly of South Africa